Bay Lake is a city in Orange County, Florida, United States. The population was 29 at the 2020 census. It is named after a lake that lies east of the Magic Kingdom. All four of the Walt Disney World Resort theme parks, and one of Walt Disney World's two water parks, are in Bay Lake, though all Disney parks in the region have mailing addresses in nearby Lake Buena Vista.

Bay Lake is one of two Florida municipalities inside the Reedy Creek Improvement District, which also includes Walt Disney World, the other being Lake Buena Vista. The city is part of the Orlando–Kissimmee–Sanford Metropolitan Statistical Area.

History

Chapter 67-1104 of the Laws of Florida, incorporating the city of Bay Lake, was signed into law by Governor Claude R. Kirk, Jr. on May 12, 1967, the same day he also signed chapters 67-764 (creating the Reedy Creek Improvement District, or RCID), also known as the Reedy Creek Improvement Act, and 67-1965 (incorporating the City of Reedy Creek). It was and still is located fully inside the RCID, and all its duties have been taken care of by the RCID. As fully described in Reedy Creek Improvement District, the city has always been controlled by the Walt Disney Company and has allowed them powers that other area attractions have not had.

Chapter 69-836 of the Laws of Florida, which became a law on July 3, 1969, without the governor's approval, redefined the city boundaries to exclude the easternmost part of Bay Lake. Chapter 69–1527, which became a law the same day, completely moved the city of Reedy Creek, with the land given up by Bay Lake included in the new city. Since then, Bay Lake has expanded to fill the original RCID west of Bonnet Creek, but the Reedy Creek Improvement District has expanded to include new land not in the city.

The RCID had all the powers of the city and more, raising the question of why cities were incorporated inside of it. Walt Disney's original plans for the site included at least one futuristic living area, a planned "community of the future". This was never built, but some of the ideas were incorporated into the EPCOT theme park. The later Celebration, Florida was deannexed from the city and the RCID in 1994 so the Walt Disney Company would not lose control of the district. The only residents of the city are Disney employees and their immediate family members who live in a community on the north shore of Bay Lake (on Bay Court). The only landowners are fully owned subsidiaries of The Walt Disney Company, rights-of-way for state and county roads, and five  lots owned by senior Disney employees to give them voting power in the Reedy Creek Improvement District.

Geography and climate

Bay Lake is located at  (28.391502, –81.566659).

The principal border that divides the cities of Lake Buena Vista to the east and Bay Lake to the west is the canal called Bonnet Creek, adjacent to Bonnet Creek Parkway. Most of the attractions associated with the Walt Disney World Resort are actually located within the City of Bay Lake, including all four theme parks.

The only long-term residents in Bay Lake live in a mobile home park on Bay Court, a street which, in 1987, was a dirt road. As of that year many employees wished to live in Bay Lake or Lake Buena Vista due to their proximity to their jobs.

Demographics

As of the census of 2000, there were 23 people, 9 households, and 6 families residing in the city. The population density was 1.2 inhabitants per square mile (0.4/km). There were 9 housing units at an average density of 0.5 per square mile (0.2/km). The racial makeup of the city in was twenty-two whites (95.7%) and one African American (4.3%). None of the people in Bay Lake were Asian, Native American or Hispanics or Latinos.

There were nine households in Bay Lake, out of which three had children under the age of 18 living with them, five had married couples living together, one had a female householder with no husband present, and three of the households were non-families. Three households were made up of individuals, and one consisted of someone living alone who was 65 years of age or older. The average household size was 2.56 and the average family size was 3.00.

The median income for a household in the city was $86,288, and the median income for a family was $86,288. Males had a median income of $76,284 versus $21,667 for females. The per capita income for the city was $26,731. None of the population and none of the families were below the poverty line.

Because of Bay Lake statistics, legislators have to be careful not to use the words "maximum" and "average" in the computations used for the State of Florida's 2007 property tax reform debate.  For example, in 2006 the “per capita levy” of property tax in Bay Lake was $176,230.  Since the statewide average that year was $475, legislators have had to be careful to distinguish the phrase "average savings" from the phrase "savings by the average taxpayer."

In 2010 Bay Lake had a population of 47.  The racial and ethnic composition of the population was 72.3% white, 6.4% Asian, 4.3% of two or more races and 17.0% Hispanic or Latino.

Points of interest
Walt Disney World:
Magic Kingdom
Disney's Fort Wilderness Resort & Campground
Magnolia and Palm Golf Courses
Disney's BoardWalk Resort
Epcot
Disney's Animal Kingdom
Disney's Blizzard Beach
Disney's Hollywood Studios
ESPN Wide World of Sports Complex

Government and infrastructure

The Reedy Creek Improvement District has its Fire Department Emergency Services station in Bay Lake (it has a Lake Buena Vista postal address).

Education
Residents of Bay Lake (Bay Court) are zoned to schools in the Orange County Public Schools:

 Bay Lake Elementary School
 It opened in 2016, relieving Horizon West area elementary schools and making it one of three schools to open that year in the county. Myrlene Kimble was the school's first principal. The  building, with a capacity of 837 students, is on a  property. In fall 2016 it had 785 students. Its design is similar to that of Independence Elementary School.
 Bridgewater Middle School
 Windermere High School

Formerly it was zoned to the following:
 Independence Elementary School (prior to 2016)
 Windermere Elementary School
 Lakeview Middle School
 West Orange High School (prior to 2017)

References

External links

Information at Reedy Creek Improvement District website

Cities in Orange County, Florida
Company towns in Florida
The Walt Disney Company
Greater Orlando
Populated places established in 1967
Cities in Florida
Reedy Creek Improvement District
1967 establishments in Florida